One athlete from Luxembourg competed at the 1900 Summer Olympics in Paris, marking the first Olympic appearance by the nation.

Michel Théato won the marathon event in athletics. For a long time, it was assumed that Théato was French, and only in the late 20th century was it discovered that he was really from Luxembourg, making him the first Olympic medalist for the nation.

Athletics

Théato competed in the marathon event of the athletics program, which he won.

Nations at the 1900 Summer Olympics
1900
Olympics
1900 in Luxembourgian sport